Black Angel is a 1946 American film noir directed as his final feature by Roy William Neill and starring Dan Duryea, June Vincent and Peter Lorre. Produced by Universal Pictures, it is set in Los Angeles and broadly adapted from the 1943 novel of the same title by Cornell Woolrich.

Plot
Catherine Bennett, a falsely convicted man's wife, together with alcoholic musician Marty Blair, team up in an attempt to clear her adulterous husband of the murder of the singer, Mavis Marlowe, who had once been Marty's wife. Their investigation leads them to confrontations with a determined policeman, LAPD Captain Flood, and a shifty nightclub owner, Mr. Marko, whom Catherine and Marty suspect may be the real killer.

Marty had seen Marko heading for Mavis Marlowe’s apartment on the night of the murder. Since Marty is a composer and pianist, while Catherine is a former singer, the two audition for a spot in Marko's club and are hired. Their suspicion is increased when Catherine recognises an envelope from Mavis's branded stationery in Marko's office; she therefore decides to search it in his absence. When she is caught, Marko admits that his daughter was being blackmailed by Mavis, but the main evidence they had been looking for, a distinctive heart-shaped brooch that Marty once gave Mavis, is not there.

Marty has fallen in love with Catherine during their partnership and he has given up drinking. On the night Catherine's husband Kirk is due to be executed, she admits to Marty that Kirk had always been the only man for her and that their own association has no future. In his disappointment, Marty goes back to the bars where he used to drink and chances on a girl wearing the brooch for which he and Catherine had been searching. The girl insists that it was Marty himself who had given it her on the night the murder was discovered.

Marty now has a flashback and realises that it was he himself who had strangled Mavis and then drunkenly forgotten. Marty's subsequent attempts to contact Captain Flood are thwarted as the final minutes tick away for Kirk, but he manages to call Flood at last to a meeting at Catherine's home, where Marty confesses what had really happened in time for Flood to get the execution stayed.

Cast
 Dan Duryea  as Martin Blair
 June Vincent as Catherine Bennett
 Peter Lorre as Marko
 Broderick Crawford as Captain Flood
 Constance Dowling as Mavis Marlowe
 Wallace Ford as Joe
 Hobart Cavanaugh as Hotel Caretaker
 Freddie Steele as Lucky
 John Phillips as Kirk Bennett
 Ben Bard as Bartender
 Junius Matthews as Dr. Courtney
 Marion Martin as Millie
 Archie Twitchell as George Mitchell (as Michael Branden)
 Maurice St. Clair as Dancer (as St. Clair)
 Vilova as Dancer
 Robert Williams as Second Detective

Interpretation
Classed as a noteworthy film noir, Black Angel was based on Cornell Woolrich's 1943 novel of the same name and directed by Roy William Neill as his final work before retirement. There were many differences from the original story and the film was disliked by Woolrich himself. However, in the opinion of biographer Thomas C. Renzi, of the several contemporary "adaptations based on Woolrich's novels, Neill's film ranks among the most competently conceived and produced, even though its plot has only  a superficial connection" with the original story line. And according to Francis M. Nevins: "Neill and cinematographer Paul Ivano invest every shot with a visual style which translates Woolrich as any novel needs to be translated: with total fidelity to its essence and little if any to its literal text." Some credit must also go to Dan Duryea's interpretation of the part of Marty Blair, who "remains the most sympathetic character in the film and far worthier of the heroine than her weak and disloyal husband".

See also

References

External links
 

1946 films
1946 crime drama films
American black-and-white films
Film noir
Films based on American novels
Films directed by Roy William Neill
Universal Pictures films
Films based on works by Cornell Woolrich
Films scored by Frank Skinner
American crime drama films
1940s English-language films
1940s American films